James Carl Jobb (born October 8, 1954), known professionally as Jim Smith, is an American animator and musician. He worked on Mighty Mouse: The New Adventures with his long-time working partner John Kricfalusi. Smith later briefly worked on Tiny Toon Adventures, and then along with Kricfalusi, Bob Camp and Lynne Naylor he founded Spümcø, where he co-created The Ren & Stimpy Show and The Ripping Friends. He is also the one playing the guitar for the Ren & Stimpy theme in the intro. His performance name is Jelly-Röel.

External links
 Jim Smith's blog
 
 Robyn Byrd’s interview with Jim Smith

References

1954 births
Animators from Texas
Living people
Spümcø
People from Lubbock, Texas